The state of Wisconsin enrolled 91,327 men for service in the Union Army during the American Civil War, 77,375 in the infantry, 8,877 in the cavalry, and 5,075 in the artillery. Some 3,802 of these men were killed in action or mortally wounded, and 8,499 died from other causes; the total mortality was thus 12,301 men.

Infantry units
1st Wisconsin Infantry Regiment (3 Months)
1st Wisconsin Infantry Regiment (3 Years)
2nd Wisconsin Infantry Regiment
3rd Wisconsin Infantry Regiment
4th Wisconsin Infantry Regiment
5th Wisconsin Infantry Regiment
6th Wisconsin Infantry Regiment
7th Wisconsin Infantry Regiment
8th Wisconsin Infantry Regiment
9th Wisconsin Infantry Regiment
10th Wisconsin Infantry Regiment
11th Wisconsin Infantry Regiment
12th Wisconsin Infantry Regiment
13th Wisconsin Infantry Regiment
14th Wisconsin Infantry Regiment
15th Wisconsin Infantry Regiment
16th Wisconsin Infantry Regiment
17th Wisconsin Infantry Regiment
18th Wisconsin Infantry Regiment
19th Wisconsin Infantry Regiment
20th Wisconsin Infantry Regiment
21st Wisconsin Infantry Regiment
22nd Wisconsin Infantry Regiment
23rd Wisconsin Infantry Regiment
24th Wisconsin Infantry Regiment
25th Wisconsin Infantry Regiment
26th Wisconsin Infantry Regiment
27th Wisconsin Infantry Regiment
28th Wisconsin Infantry Regiment
29th Wisconsin Infantry Regiment
30th Wisconsin Infantry Regiment
31st Wisconsin Infantry Regiment
32nd Wisconsin Infantry Regiment
33rd Wisconsin Infantry Regiment
34th Wisconsin Infantry Regiment
35th Wisconsin Infantry Regiment
36th Wisconsin Infantry Regiment
37th Wisconsin Infantry Regiment
38th Wisconsin Infantry Regiment
39th Wisconsin Infantry Regiment
40th Wisconsin Infantry Regiment
41st Wisconsin Infantry Regiment
42nd Wisconsin Infantry Regiment
43rd Wisconsin Infantry Regiment
44th Wisconsin Infantry Regiment
45th Wisconsin Infantry Regiment
46th Wisconsin Infantry Regiment
47th Wisconsin Infantry Regiment
48th Wisconsin Infantry Regiment
49th Wisconsin Infantry Regiment
50th Wisconsin Infantry Regiment
51st Wisconsin Infantry Regiment
52nd Wisconsin Infantry Regiment
53rd Wisconsin Infantry Regiment

Cavalry units
1st Wisconsin Cavalry Regiment 
2nd Wisconsin Cavalry Regiment
3rd Wisconsin Cavalry Regiment
4th Wisconsin Cavalry Regiment

Artillery units
1st Wisconsin Heavy Artillery Regiment 
1st Independent Battery Wisconsin Light Artillery 
2nd Independent Battery Wisconsin Light Artillery 
3rd Independent Battery Wisconsin Light Artillery 
4th Independent Battery Wisconsin Light Artillery 
5th Independent Battery Wisconsin Light Artillery 
6th Independent Battery Wisconsin Light Artillery 
7th Independent Battery Wisconsin Light Artillery 
8th Independent Battery Wisconsin Light Artillery 
9th Independent Battery Wisconsin Light Artillery 
10th Independent Battery Wisconsin Light Artillery 
11th Independent Battery Wisconsin Light Artillery 
12th Independent Battery Wisconsin Light Artillery 
13th Independent Battery Wisconsin Light Artillery

Special units
1st Wisconsin Sharpshooters

See also
 Lists of American Civil War Regiments by State

References

Further reading

External links
 Wisconsin Civil War Regimental Histories - Wisconsin Historical Society
 Wisconsin Civil War Regimental Histories - Wisconsin Veterans Museum
 The Civil War Archive

 
Civil War Units
Wisconsin